A plantation house is the main house of a plantation, often a substantial farmhouse, which often serves as a symbol for the plantation as a whole. Plantation houses in the Southern United States and in other areas are known as quite grand and expensive architectural works today, though most were more utilitarian, working farmhouses.

Antebellum American South 

In the American South, antebellum plantations were centered on a "plantation house," the residence of the owner, where important business was conducted. Slavery and plantations had different characteristics in different regions of the South. As the Upper South of the Chesapeake Bay colonies developed first, historians of the antebellum South defined planters as those who held 20 enslaved people. Major planters held many more, especially in the Deep South as it developed. The majority of slaveholders held 10 or fewer enslaved people, often to labor domestically. By the late 18th century, most planters in the Upper South had switched from exclusive tobacco cultivation to mixed-crop production, both because tobacco had exhausted the soil and because of changing markets. The shift away from tobacco meant they had slaves in excess of the number needed for labor, and they began to sell them in the internal slave trade.

There was a variety of domestic architecture on plantations. The largest and wealthiest planter families, for instance, those with estates fronting on the James River in Virginia, constructed mansions in brick and Georgian style, e.g. Shirley Plantation. Common or smaller planters in the late 18th and 19th century had more modest wood-frame buildings, such as Southall Plantation in Charles City County.

In the Lowcountry of South Carolina, by contrast, even before the American Revolution, planters holding large rice plantations typically owned hundreds of enslaved people. In Charleston and Savannah, the elite also held numerous enslaved people to work as household servants. The 19th-century development of the Deep South for cotton cultivation depended on large plantations with much more acreage than was typical of the Upper South; and for labor, planters held hundreds of enslaved people.

Until December 1865, slavery was legal in parts of the United States. Most enslaved people labored in agricultural production, and planter was a term commonly used to describe a farmer with many enslaved humans.

The term planter has no universally-accepted definition, but academic historians have defined it to identify the elite class, "a landowning farmer of substantial means."  In the "Black Belt" counties of Alabama and Mississippi, the terms "planter" and "farmer" were often synonymous. Robert Fogel and Stanley Engerman define large planters as owning over 50 enslaved people, and medium planters as owning between 16 and 50 enslaved humans.

In his study of Black Belt counties in Alabama, Jonathan Wiener defines planters by ownership of real property, rather than of enslaved people. A planter, for Wiener, owned at least $10,000 worth of real estate in 1850 and $32,000 worth in 1860, equivalent to about the top 8 percent of landowners. In his study of southwest Georgia, Lee Formwalt also defines planters in size of land holdings rather than enslaved people. Formwalt's planters are in the top 4.5 percent of land owners, translating into real estate worth $6,000 or more in 1850, $24,000 or more in 1860, and $11,000 or more in 1870. In his study of Harrison County, Texas, Randolph B. Campbell classifies large planters as owners of 20 enslaved humans, and small planters as owners of between ten and 19 enslaved humans. In Chicot and Phillips counties, Arkansas, Carl H. Moneyhon defines large planters as owners of twenty or more enslaved humans, and six hundred or more acres.

Plantation house in the Southern United States 

Most historical research has focused on the main houses of plantations, primarily because they were the most likely to survive and usually the most elaborate structures in the complex. Also, until fairly recent times, scholars and local historians usually focused on the life of the plantation owner, that is, the planter, and his or her family rather than the people they held as slaves. All romanticized notions aside, the plantation house was, at its most basic, a functioning farmhouse.  Although some plantation houses were planned as grand mansions and were built all at once from the ground up, many more began as fairly rudimentary structures that either stayed that way, were replaced, or were enlarged and improved over time as fortunes improved. In most areas of the South, the earliest settlers constructed houses to provide basic shelter suited to their local climate, not to establish permanence or demonstrate wealth or power.

In colonial Delaware, Georgia, Maryland, North Carolina, South Carolina, and Virginia, the earliest plantation houses tended to follow British-derived folk forms such as the hall and parlor house-type and central-passage house-type.

Grander structures during the later colonial period usually conformed to the neoclassically-influenced styles, although some very early and rare Jacobean structures survive in Virginia. And in the southern portion of what became the state of Louisiana, the plantations reflected French Colonial architectural types, some with Spanish influences, that remained in trend well after the Louisiana Purchase in 1803. Following the Revolutionary War, Federal and Jeffersonian-type neoclassicism became dominant in formal plantation architecture.

Large portions of the South outside of the original British colonies, such as in Kentucky and Tennessee, did not see extensive settlement until the early 1800s. Although large portions of Alabama and Mississippi were settled at roughly the same time, there were areas of these states, along with portions of western Georgia and southeastern Tennessee, that did not see wide-scale settlement until after the Indian removal in the 1830s. Very little formal architecture existed within these newly settled areas, with most dwellings being of hewn logs into the 1840s. The dogtrot-type plan was common for many of these log houses.

Rough vernacular architecture for early plantations was also true in Arkansas and Missouri although in their river regions. Admitted to the Union in the mid-1840s, early architecture in Florida and Texas generally showed a stronger Spanish Colonial architectural influence, blended with French and British forms.

Some of the wealthiest planters never built grand residences. One example was noted by Albert J. Pickett, an early Alabama historian. In 1850, he visited Nicholas Davis, the owner of the prosperous Walnut Grove Plantation. Despite owning more than 100 slaves, he was still living in the large log house he had built after his migration from Virginia in 1817. He told Pickett that he "would not exchange (it) for a palace". Even Gaineswood, now a National Historic Landmark due to it being considered a lavish example of a plantation house, began as a two-story hewn-log dogtrot that was eventually enveloped within the brick mass of the house.

After the period of initial settlement, more refined folk house types came from the older portions of the South, especially the I-house, thought by architectural scholars to be a descendant of the hall and parlor and the central-passage house-types.  The central-passage house continued to be popular and could be either single-pile (one room deep) or double-pile (two rooms deep). If it had a porch, it was under a separate roof attached to the main house.

I-houses were always two stories high, always single-pile, with side gables or a hipped roof. They were at least two rooms wide, with latter examples usually having a central hall dividing them. In the South, they usually had full-width one-story shed extensions to the front and rear. These sheds could manifest as open porches, enclosed rooms, or a combination of the two. This I-house with sheds came to be commonly referred to as "Plantation Plain". It also proved to be one of the most adaptable folk house types to changing architectural tastes, with some even having neoclassical porticoes and other high-style elements added to them at a later date.

Another house type, the Creole cottage, came from the areas along the Gulf Coast and its associated rivers that were formerly part of New France. It was always one-and-a-half stories, with a side-gabled roof, and often had upper floor dormer windows. However, it accommodated a full-width front porch under the main roof, with doors or jib-windows opening from all of the rooms onto the porch, and was usually raised high above the ground on a full raised basement or piers. It was a common form for many early plantation houses and town houses alike in the lower reaches of Alabama, Louisiana, and Mississippi.

When the cotton boom years began in the 1830s, the United States was entering its second neoclassical phase, with Greek Revival architecture being the dominant style. By this point trained architects were also becoming more common, and several introduced the style to the South. Whereas the earlier Federal and Jeffersonian neoclassicism displayed an almost feminine lightness, academic Greek Revival was very masculine, with a heaviness not seen in the earlier styles.

Earlier neoclassicism had often used ancient Roman models and the Tuscan order, along with the Roman versions of the original three Greek orders. The original Greek orders were Doric, Ionic, and the Corinthian. The academic version of Greek Revival embraced the pure form of ancient Grecian architecture. Due to its popularity during a time of great wealth for many southern plantations, it was the Greek Revival that became permanently linked to the plantation legend. Though some houses were architect-designed, many, if not most, were designed by the owners or their carpenters from pattern books published by Asher Benjamin, Minard Lafever, John Haviland, and others. Greek Revival proved to very adaptable to the hot and humid climate of the South, with colloquial adaptations of the style seen from one region, and sometimes from one town, to another.

Greek Revival would remain a favorite architectural style in the agrarian South until well after the Civil War, but other styles had appeared in the nation about the same time as Greek Revival or soon afterward. These were primarily the Italianate and Gothic Revival. They were slower to be adopted in whole for domestic plantation architecture, but they can be seen in a fusion of stylistic influences. Houses that were basically Greek Revival in character sprouted Italianate towers, bracketed eaves, or adopted the asymmetrical massing characteristic of that style.

Although never as popular as Greek Revival, fully Gothic Revival and Italianate plantation houses began to appear by the 1850s, after being popularized by the books of men such as Alexander Jackson Davis, Andrew Jackson Downing, and Samuel Sloan. The Gothic Revival was usually expressed in wood as Carpenter Gothic. Italianate was the most popular of the two styles. It was also most commonly built using wood construction when used for plantation houses, although a few brick examples, such as Kenworthy Hall, have survived.

The outbreak of war in 1861 put an abrupt end to the building of grand mansions. Following the war and the end of Reconstruction, the economy was drastically altered. Planters often did not have the funds for upkeep of their existing houses and new construction virtually ceased on most plantations. The new sharecropping method kept many plantations going, but the days of extravagance were over.

References 

Antebellum architecture
Plantations
Farmhouses
Mansions